Zlatitsa is a town and the seat of the Zlatitsa Municipality in southern Bulgaria located in the Zlatitsa-Pirdop valley. It is situated immediately south in the lap of the Zlatitsa -Teteven Mountain. The population is 5,286.

The main highway Sofia - Karlovo - Bourgas as well as the main railway line Sofia - Karlovo - Bourgas passes through it.

 south of Zlatitsa is the Old Kemer – a bridge spanning the river Topolnitsa from Roman times. The park monument Kambana can be found in the nearby village of Petrich.

The Battle of Zlatitsa was fought nearby on 12 December 1443.

Between 1 April 1978 and 31 August 1991, Zlatitsa together with Pirdop formed a single town called Srednogorie.

Notable people
 Valko Chervenkov, Bulgarian leader of the Communist Party and politician

References

Populated places in Sofia Province
Towns in Bulgaria